Peter the Mariner is a 1929 German silent comedy drama film directed by Reinhold Schünzel and starring Schünzel, Renate Müller, and Hans Heinrich von Twardowski. It was shot at the Grunewald Studios in Berlin and on location in St. Moritz and in the North Sea.

Synopsis
A man goes on a series of travels around the world after discovering that his wife has been unfaithful to him.

Cast
 Reinhold Schünzel as Peter Sturz
 Renate Müller as Victoria
 Hans Heinrich von Twardowski as Adolf Angel
 Rudolf Biebrach as Martin
 Allan Durant as Herbert Röder

References

Bibliography

External links

1929 films
1929 comedy-drama films
Films of the Weimar Republic
German silent feature films
German comedy-drama films
Films directed by Reinhold Schünzel
German black-and-white films
Silent comedy-drama films
1920s German films
1920s German-language films